Sir Woolf Fisher (20 May 1912 – 12 January 1975) was a New Zealand businessman and philanthropist who along with Maurice Paykel co-founded Fisher & Paykel, a major appliance manufacturing company, and the Ra Ora Stud, an important Thoroughbred racehorse breeding operation.

Biography
Born in Wellington, his family moved to Auckland where he studied at Mount Albert Grammar School. Woolf is the oldest brother of renowned fashion entrepreneur and philanthropist, Gus Fisher. A salesman turned businessman, Fisher was involved in a number of successful New Zealand enterprises. He served as the first chairman of New Zealand Steel.

In 1960, he established the Woolf Fisher Trust to provide funding that maintained the salaries of post-primary schoolteachers and principals while sending them overseas to further their education. Fisher also supported the Outward Bound Trust of New Zealand and in 1961 became its first president.

In the 1964 New Year Honours, Fisher was appointed a Knight Bachelor for public services, particularly in connection with the development of industry. He died in 1975 while at his bach on the lake at Rotorua. In 1994, Fisher was an inaugural inductee into the New Zealand Business Hall of Fame.

Thoroughbred racing
A polo enthusiast who was responsible for the revival of the Auckland Polo Club in 1955, Fisher became a major figure in the sport of Thoroughbred racing. In 1950 he established Ra Ora Stud at Mount Wellington whose success led to new facilities being constructed in 1962 on 71.6 hectares at East Tamaki, just out of Auckland. The breeding farm stood important stallions such as Sovereign Edition (Ire), Soviet Star (USA), Nassipour (USA), Desert Sun (GB), and Marju among others. Ra Ora Stud continued in operation after Fisher's death in 1975. Run by a Board of Trustees for his estate, it closed in 2001 and its bloodstock sold at auction.

Fisher served on the Board of Directors of the Auckland Racing Club for 17 years, with two years as its president.

References

External links
 Mackie, William. A Noble Breed: Auckland Racing Club 1874–1974, pages 49, 249, 299 (1974) (AWMM NZ Coll, SF 335).
Biography of Woolf Fisher at the Auckland Museum
Sir Woolf Fisher at the Dictionary of New Zealand Biography

1912 births
1975 deaths
20th-century New Zealand businesspeople
New Zealand racehorse owners and breeders
New Zealand philanthropists
New Zealand Jews
People educated at Mount Albert Grammar School
People from Wellington City
New Zealand Knights Bachelor
Businesspeople awarded knighthoods
20th-century philanthropists
New Zealand Racing Hall of Fame inductees